Chemicals as elements, compounds, mixtures, solutions and emulsions are very widely used and transported in the modern industrial society. Of necessity, they are also used in schools, universities and other training facilities to educate pupils in their safe use and handling and also are commonly used in domestic situations for cleaning, gardening and DIY. However, there are chemicals that should not mix or get in contact with others, as they can produce byproducts that may be toxic, carcinogenic, explosive etc, or can be dangerous themselves. To avoid disasters and mishaps, maintaining safety is considered paramount, especially by chemists.

Chemical safety includes all those policies, procedures and practices designed to minimise the risk of exposure to potentially hazardous chemicals. This includes the risks of exposure to persons handling the chemicals, to the surrounding environment, and to the communities and ecosystems within that environment.

The hazardous nature of many chemicals may be increased when mixed with other chemicals, heated or handled inappropriately. In a chemically safe environment, users are able to take appropriate actions in case of accidents although many incidents of exposure to chemical hazards occur outside of a controlled environments such as manufacturing plants or laboratories.

It is estimated that 1.6 million human deaths occur each year from contact with hazardous chemicals. and that in 2016, 45 million disability-adjusted life-years were lost, a significant increase from 2012.

Risks and hazards
Chemicals in use in industry and research have a range of properties which cause them to be hazardous to life.
These include explosiveness, flammability, toxicity, carcinogenicity and teratogenicity. They may also emit radiation and they may exist at high or low temperatures generating a risk or burning or freezing. Substances such as strong alkalis and strong acids can cause chemical burning. Any one chemical or mixture may exhibit several of these properties.

Toxic materials may be solids in powdered or finely divided form, liquids or gases and any of these materials may all be absorbed by inhalation, directly through the skin of by contact with mucous membranes in the nose or eyes. Some chemicals may persist in the body for substantial periods and can continue to exhibit toxicity. Examples of such materials include mercury, arsenic, dioxins and many organic solvents which can be stored in fat cells.

Environmental risks may be difficult to evaluate and may take years to become apparent. The risk to the Earth's ozone layer from the release of CFCs required the investigative powers of scientists throughout the world to understand fully. Science is still working out the seriousness of the effects of persistent halogenated organics on the marine food chain with some of these chemicals becoming concentrated in the fatty deposits of top predators in concentrations that appear to effect their reproductive success.

Protocols, rules, procedures and standards
A chemically safe environment includes agreed standards and terminology, rules about handling use and transportation, protocols for managing reagents and products, and internationally accepted and standardised warning and information signage. From this are derived, standards related to personal protective equipment (PPE), containment and clean-up procedures, reporting of accidents and incidents and the collection and reporting on data about incidents where hazardous chemicals have cause risk to life, health or the environment.

Management and control
The management and control of chemical safety is widely developed through primary legislation and orders derived from such legislation in the western world and in Australasia. The implementation of such legislation follows a variety of patterns from the European model of detailed Directives and orders implemented through country specific legislation to the US model of wide ranging federal enactments with control divided between State legislations and Federal Government leading to some variation in applications within a standardised labelling framework. Examples from these areas are described below.

Europe
The Chemicals Agents Directive a daughter directive of Directive 89/391/EEC, provides the framework for managing chemical safety  The European Chemicals Agency is the responsible agency and specifically implements Registration, Evaluation, Authorisation and Restriction of Chemicals (REACH), sets the standards and ensures compliance across the European Union. The European Chemicals Agency sits under REACH and manages the technical and administrative aspects of the implementation of the Directive.

New Zealand
The administrative framework is based on Health and Safety at Work (Hazardous Substances) Regulations 2017 and is implemented and enforced by Worksafe, a government agency. Although this legislation is comprehensive in its coverage it does not extend beyond the workplace and imposes no duties or responsibilities in regard to hazardous materials in domestic or educational establishments.

UK
In the UK legislation to address chemical safety has been incorporated in many pieces of legislation from the early factories acts onwards. The current Health and Safety at Work etc. Act 1974 provided an all encompassing piece of legislation which covered chemical safety amongst a wide range of other measures designed to improve the safety in the workplace in the UK

Enforcement of chemical safety is the responsibility of the Health and Safety Executive (HSE)  which implements relevant sections of the Health and Safety at Work etc. Act 1974, formulates regulations, provides safety advice and guidance and investigates major chemical incidents such the Buncefield fire in 2005.

US
In the US, the U.S. Chemical Safety and Hazard Investigation Board is responsible for investigating major chemical accidents and making recommendations to mitigate such events in the future. However relaxation in the Chemical disaster rule by the Trump administration may be implicated in a series of  explosions, for example,  the State of Texas

Risk areas

Manufacturing
The manufacture and purification of chemicals can involve a range of reagents which may themselves be hazardous, and a range of products which equally may be hazardous. For example, in order to produce the herbicide 2,4,5-Trichlorophenol, chlorine, an acutely toxic gas, is reacted with phenol, a hazardous organic liquid. The output is typically a mixture of chlorinated organic compounds, only some of which are the desired product. In this example, contaminants can include 2,3,7,8-tetrachlorodibenzodioxin, a dioxin, one of the most toxic synthetic chemicals known which is both acutely and chronically toxic and teratogenic and whose use on one occasion led to the abandonment of the Times Beach, Missouri. This reaction was also the cause of the infamous Bhopal disaster during which the highly poisonous gas methyl isocyanate was released.

Laboratories
Laboratories in schools, university, research establishments and manufacturing typically store and handle a wide range of chemicals. Safety standards for such areas are high and most laboratories provide specific infrastructure to minimise risk including fume cupboards, impervious and inert work surfaces, emergency shower stations and strict policies on the wearing of appropriate PPE.

Domestic use
There are many hazardous chemicals in routine use in the domestic environment including cleaning agents such as bleach and caustic soda. Some modern cleaning formulations also contain sodium silicate and other highly alkaline components. Modern packaging into "pods" may increase the risk of misuse, particularly for small children.

Waste disposal
Surplus hazardous materials often reach the waste stream , whether by being placed in the solid waste stream or being flushed away down sinks, basins or toilets. Although dilution may reduce the immediate risk, the long term environmental risk remains and can be made more serious as more hazardous materials are disposed of in the waste water stream. Disposal with solid waste poses risks to those handling the waste and may pose unexpected risks to uninformed members of the public. Some industrial waste chemical dumps have been known to spontaneously ignite, years after the waste had been deposited. Aluminium dross processing can produce a flux-rich waste that evolves ammonia gas if wetted, and can also spontaneously ignite when stored in bulk.

Common safety practices

PPE 
Basic chemical safety practice includes wearing protective personal equipment such as safety goggles. Personal protective equipment is combination of safe work practices but alone does not provide sufficient protection from the risks posed by hazardous chemicals but it is an effective approach to minimize the risk of exposure in controlled environments.  Safety googles are required when handling chemicals to prevent chemicals from getting into eyes. Wearing standard gloves, closed toed shoes, long trousers, and laboratory coats to protect the stomach, back and forearm is usually required in the laboratory with similar provisions for the workplace. Regulation of use of PPE is very variable and varies by country. In some countries such as the US, standards may vary from state to state with some states imposing extra regulations to protect laboratory workers from risks.

Labelling
For most of the world, a standard set of illustrative pictograms have been adopted to indicate where hazards exists and the type of hazard present. These pictograms are routinely displayed on containers, transport vehicles, safety advice and anywhere where the material occurs. These have been extended and standardised as the Globally Harmonized System of Classification and Labelling of Chemicals and are now used throughout much of the world.  

In the US, an NFPA diamond is used to identify chemical hazards such as flammability, corrosivity, toxicity, and reactivity. This label is made up of four colour-coded fields: red(flammability), blue(health hazard), yellow(chemical reactivity), and white(special hazard). The numbering ranges from 0 to 4 (for colours except white), and 0 means that there is no potential hazard, whereas 4 indicates the chemical is extremely hazardous.

Transportation 
In a number of countries, the Hazchem system is used whenever a potentially hazardous cargo is transported whether by road, rail, sea or air. The standardised HAZCHEM sign provides details of the material being transported, the nature of the hazard and the approved emergency response.

In the workplace, chemicals are classified using Safety data sheet(SDS) which are standardised document that includes workplace health, restrictions, emergency numbers, and other safety information.

Physical and health hazards 
Physical hazards of a chemical include its environmental persistence, its adverse health potential such as carcinogenicity, its flammability and reactivity.  Chemicals that affect health depend on its toxicity and hazard. Toxicity is the potential of a chemical to do harm, and hazard is the possibility that the chemical will cause harm under certain conditions.

Accidents 
Significant chemical incidents include the Thiokol-Woodbine explosion and the 2020 Beirut explosion involving a shipment of ammonium nitrate, a powerful explosive.
The Chernobyl and Fukushima disasters, were accidents caused by a failures of safety policies and by inadequate safety planning

See also 
 Chemical protective clothing
 Chemical safety assessment
 Chemical accident
 Occupational safety and health

References

External links
OEDC Chemical Safety
ACS Safety in Laboratories

 
Risk management